Dymi is a former municipality in Achaea, West Greece, Greece. Since the 2011 local government reform it is part of the municipality West Achaea, of which it is a municipal unit. The municipal unit has an area of 71.553 km2. Its seat of administration was the town of Kato Achaia. It is located 20 km southwest of Patras.

Population history

Subdivisions
The municipal unit Dymi is subdivided into the following communities (constituent villages in brackets):
Kato Achaia (Kato Achaia, Alykes, Manetaiikia, Paralia Kato Achaias, Piso Sykea)
Agiovlasitika (Agiovlasitika, Kapeli, Lefkos, Stenaitika)
Alissos (Alissos, Kamenitsa, Paralia Alissou, Profitis Elissaios)
Ano Achaia
Elaiochori
Kato Alissos (Kato Alissos, Gialos)
Niforeika (Niforeika, Paralia Niforeikon)
Petrochori (Petrochori, Veskoukaiika, Vythoulkas, Zampeteika, Karya, Lampraiika, Logothetis)

See also
Dyme, ancient city
List of settlements in Achaea

References

External links
website of the municipality
GTP - Kato Achaia
GTP - Municipality of Dymi

 
Populated places in Achaea